Marston is a village in the civil parish of Old Marston about  northeast of the centre of Oxford, England. It was absorbed within the city boundaries in 1991. It is commonly called Old Marston to distinguish it from the suburb of New Marston that developed between St. Clement's and the village in the 19th and 20th centuries. The A40 Northern Bypass, part of the Oxford Ring Road forms a long north-west boundary of the village and parish and a limb, namely a distributary, of the Cherwell forms the western boundary.

History
The toponym is said to come from "Marsh-town", because of the low-lying nature of the land, still green space, near the River Cherwell, which in earlier times was liable to frequent flooding. The parish used to be part of the manor of Headington. The Church of England parish church of St Nicholas began as a chapel, first mentioned in a charter of 1122 by which it was granted to the Augustinians canons of St Frideswide's Priory. The building dates from the 12th century, and has substantial additions in the 15th century.

The village played an important part in the Civil War, during the siege of Oxford. While the Royalist forces were besieged in the city, which had been used by King Charles I as his capital, the Parliamentary forces under Sir Thomas Fairfax had quarters in Marston, and used the church tower as a lookout post for viewing the enemy's artillery positions in what is now the University Parks. Oliver Cromwell visited Fairfax at Manor House, which is now known as "Cromwell House" at 17 Mill Lane, and "Manor House" at 15 Mill Lane, and the Treaty for the Surrender of Oxford was signed there in 1646.

In the 20th-century expansion of Oxford, new housing followed the Marston Road from St Clement's towards Marston, which was soon absorbed by the city. New Marston became a separate parish in the 1950s. Old Marston parish become part of the City of Oxford in 1991. It retains its (civil) parish council. Marston has had a number of notable residents, including members of the Oxford penicillin team: Howard Florey and his second wife Margaret Jennings, and Norman Heatley. The village has been associated with the origin of the Jack Russell breed of terrier.

Amenities
A cycle route links Marston with central Oxford via the meadows west of New Marston, over a bridge on the River Cherwell, past the southern boundary of The Parks to the junction of South Parks Road and St Cross Road near the Science Area of Oxford University. It is also possible to walk on footpaths across the meadows to the Parks, either via Mesopotamia Walk or Rainbow Bridge.

See also
 Victoria Arms, Marston

References

Sources

External links

 Marston section on Headington community website
 Blue plaque marks Civil War surrender Oxford Mail article on 19 June 2013

Villages in Oxfordshire
Areas of Oxford